Pharsalia variegata is a species of beetle in the family Cerambycidae. It was described by Per Olof Christopher Aurivillius in 1920.

References

External links 
PDF Digital version of Cerambycidae: Cerambycinae (1912)

variegata
Beetles described in 1920